A cog is a tooth of a gear or cogwheel or the gear itself.

Cog, COG, CoG, or The Cog  may also refer to:

Science and engineering
 Rear sprocket of a bicycle
 Cog (ship), a type of sailboat from the 10th century onward
 Center of gravity, a spatial point related to an object's center of mass
 Cluster of Orthologous Groups of proteins; see Sequence homology and MicrobesOnline
Conserved oligomeric Golgi complex, that includes COG2, COG4, etc.
INSEE code (also code officiel géographique), a numerical indexing code used by the French National Institute for Statistics and Economic Studies
Mount Washington Cog Railway, the world's first mountain-climbing cog railway
OpenCog, a project that aims to build an open source artificial general intelligence framework
 Chip on Glass; see Liquid-crystal display

Entertainment and media
 C.O.G., a 2013 American drama
 "The Changing of the Guard" (The Twilight Zone), a 1962 episode of the TV series The Twilight Zone
 "Cog" (advertisement), a British television and cinema advertisement launched by Honda
 Star Wars Jedi Quest 8: The Changing of the Guard, the eighth book in the Star Wars Jedi Quest series by Jude Watson
 COG, a 2020 novel by Greg van Eekhout

Fiction
 Coalition of Ordered Governments, a fictional organization from the Gears of War series
 Cogs, the fictional antagonists in the MMORPG Toontown Online
 Cogs, the fictional foot soldiers of Power Rangers Machine Empire

Music
 Cog (band), an Australian progressive rock band
 "Changing of the Guards", a single from Bob Dylan's 1978 album Street-Legal
 The Changing of the Guard (album), 2010 album by indie rock band Starflyer 59
 "Change of the Guard", a song from Steely Dan's 1972 album Can't Buy a Thrill
 "Changing of the Guard", a song from Exodus' 1990 album Impact Is Imminent

Organizations
 Canberra Ornithologists Group, an Australian ornithological organization
 Children's Oncology Group, a National Cancer Institute supported clinical trials group
 Church of God (disambiguation), a name used by numerous, mostly unrelated Christian denominational bodies
 Council of governments, regional bodies that exist throughout the United States
 Covenant of the Goddess, a cross-traditional Wiccan group
 The ISO 3166-1 alpha-3 country code for Republic of the Congo

Other uses
Cog (software), an open source audio player for Mac OS X
Cog (project), a project at the Humanoid Robotics Group of the Massachusetts Institute of Technology
 Continuity of government, defined procedures that allow a government to continue its essential operations in case of catastrophe
 Changing of the Guard (or Guard Mounting), a formal ceremony in which sentries are relieved by their replacements
 Course over ground, the actual path followed by a vessel from A to B as determined by its course

See also
 Change of gauge (disambiguation), with various senses in the airline and rail industries
 C0G, an EIA Class 1 dielectric material with the lowest capacitance/temperature dependence
 CoG (disambiguation)
 COGS (disambiguation)
 Coq, in computer science, Coq is an interactive theorem prover
 Kog (disambiguation)